Bulbophyllum kingii is a species of orchid. It is native to Sikkim, Laos, Myanmar Thailand, and Eastern Himalaya.

References

External links
IOSPE
William Hennis Orchideen
Swiss Orchid Foundation at the Herbarium Jany Renz
Piniterest

kingii
Flora of Bhutan
Flora of Assam (region)
Orchids of Myanmar
Orchids of India
Orchids of Thailand
Flora of Sikkim